The Counter Jumper is a 1922 American film directed by Larry Semon and featuring Oliver Hardy. It is a remake of the 1919 film The Grocery Clerk, which was also directed by Semon. The film was screened at the Museum of Modern Art in 2009 as part of a series examining slapstick.

Cast
 Larry Semon as Larry, the Counter Jumper
 Lucille Carlisle as Glorietta Hope
 Oliver Hardy as Gaston Gilligan (as Babe Hardy)
 Spencer Bell as A Clerk
 Eva Thatcher
 Jack Duffy
 William McCall
 Reginald Lyons
 James Donnelly
 William Hauber as Bit Role (uncredited)
 Joe Rock as Bit Role (uncredited)
 Al Thompson as Bit Role (uncredited)

See also
 List of American films of 1922
 Oliver Hardy filmography

References

External links

1922 films
American silent short films
American black-and-white films
1922 short films
Short film remakes
Films directed by Larry Semon
Silent American comedy films
American comedy short films
1922 comedy films
1920s American films
1920s English-language films